The David A. Johnston Cascades Volcano Observatory (CVO) is a volcano observatory in the US that monitors volcanoes in the northern Cascade Range. It was established in the summer of 1980, after the eruption of Mount St. Helens. The observatory is named for United States Geological Survey (USGS) volcanologist David A. Johnston, who was swept away in the Mount St. Helens eruption on the morning of May 18, 1980.  The observatory's current territory covers Oregon, Washington, and Idaho. The Cascade Range's extent includes northern California, and Cascade volcanoes in that state, such as Mount Shasta and Lassen Peak, previously fell under the CVO's jurisdiction. However, these volcanoes now fall under the jurisdiction of the California Volcano Observatory (CalVO), formed in February 2012 and based in Menlo Park, California, which monitors and researches volcanic activity throughout California and Nevada.

The Cascades Volcano Observatory is part of the USGS, a scientific agency of the United States government. It is located in Vancouver, Washington in the Portland, Oregon metropolitan area.

Monitored volcanoes

This list shows volcanoes currently monitored by the Cascades Volcano Observatory, which range in order of highest to lowest risk assessment.

According to USGS risk assessment of volcanoes located in the northern Cascades region, the following volcanoes were ranked "very high threat potential".
Crater Lake in southwestern Oregon near Klamath Falls
Glacier Peak in northern Washington
Mount Baker in northern Washington
Mount Hood in northwestern Oregon near Portland
Mount Rainier in central Washington near Tacoma
Mount St. Helens in southwestern Washington near Vancouver
Newberry Volcano in central Oregon near Bend
Three Sisters in west central Oregon near Bend

The following volcanoes were ranked "high threat potential":
Mount Adams in southwestern Washington

The following volcanoes were ranked "moderate threat potential":
Mount Bachelor in west central Oregon near Bend

The following volcanoes were ranked "Low to Very Low Threat Potential":
Belknap Crater in central Oregon
Black Butte Crater Lava Field in southern Idaho near Shoshone
Blue Lake Crater in northern Oregon
Cinnamon Butte in southwestern Oregon near Crater Lake
Craters of the Moon Volcanic Field in southeastern Idaho near Pocatello
Davis Lake Volcanic Field in central Oregon
Devils Garden Volcanic Field in central Oregon
Diamond Craters in southeastern Oregon near Burns
Hell's Half Acre Lava Field in southeastern Idaho near Idaho Falls
Indian Heaven in southwestern Washington near Mount St. Helens
Jordan Craters in southeastern Oregon
Mount Jefferson in northwestern Oregon
Sand Mountain Volcanic Field in west central Oregon near Mount Jefferson
Wapi Lava Field in southeastern Idaho near Pocatello
West Crater in southwestern Washington near Mount St. Helens

There are other volcanoes in the northern Cascades region that have not been assessed one of these risk levels which warrant monitoring. Volcanoes that have not erupted during the Holocene period were not included. USGS has noted, though less probable, that it is still possible for volcanoes to erupt on longer intervals than mentioned.

References

External links

 

Earth sciences
Government agencies established in 1980
Buildings and structures in Vancouver, Washington
Volcano observatories
Volcanoes of the United States
United States Geological Survey
Buildings and structures in Washington (state)